Robin Fraser-Paye is a British costume designer, noted for his designs of historical garb in British television and films and plays. He is probably best known for working on the set of the Sharpe series in the 1990s, but has also designed for King Richard the Second (TV movie) (1978), Crime and Punishment (1979), The Woman He Loved (TV movie) (1988) for which he was nominated for an Emmy, Agatha Christie's Poirot (1991) and Born and Bred (2004). He has also been the principal costume designer of numerous Shakespeare productions and also designed the clothing for The Misanthrope at the Stratford Festival.

References

External links
 

British costume designers
Living people
Year of birth missing (living people)